Sean Ortiz (born April 5, 1985) is a former professional Canadian football defensive lineman who played in the Canadian Football League. He originally signed with the Toronto Argonauts as an undrafted free agent in 2010. In his current tenure with the BC Lions, he signed with the team on March 9, 2012. He was released by the Lions on June 24, 2012. He played CIS football for the UBC Thunderbirds and college football for the Minot State Beavers.

References

External links
BC Lions bio

1985 births
Living people
BC Lions players
Canadian football defensive linemen
Minot State Beavers football players
Montreal Alouettes players
Players of Canadian football from British Columbia
Toronto Argonauts players
UBC Thunderbirds football players